Joe White was a Welsh boxer.  He won the British welterweight title at Cardiff in August 1907 when he defeated Andrew Jeptha.

References

Year of birth missing
Year of death missing
Welsh male boxers
Welterweight boxers